Vladimir Yampolsky (1905–1965) was a Soviet pianist who served as David Oistrakh's accompanist in several recordings.

References

External links
 ArkivMusic 

1905 births
1965 deaths
Soviet classical pianists
Jewish classical pianists
Male classical pianists
Classical accompanists
20th-century classical pianists
20th-century Russian male musicians